Stéphane Gagne (born February 16, 1969 in Saint-Vallier, Saône-et-Loire) is a French sport shooter. He competed at the 2000 Summer Olympics in the men's 50 metre pistol event, in which he placed 26th, and the men's 10 metre air pistol event, in which he placed fifth.

References

1969 births
Living people
ISSF pistol shooters
French male sport shooters
Shooters at the 2000 Summer Olympics
Olympic shooters of France
20th-century French people